Ana Maria Lopez may refer to:

Ana María López Colomé, Mexican biochemist
Ana María López Calleja (born 1968), Spanish Paralympic athlete